Robert Friend Kallman (May 21, 1922 – August 8, 2003) was an American scientist known for his early research on the effects of radiation on cancer cells. He died on August 8, 2003 at Stanford Hospital of lung disease.

References

1922 births
2003 deaths
20th-century American scientists
Deaths from lung disease